Shepherds Well may refer to:

 Shepherdswell, a village in Kent, England
 Shepherds Well railway station, the railway station serving Shepherdswell, Kent, England